Karol Zając (19 May 1913 – 18 May 1965) was a Polish alpine skier. He competed in the men's combined event at the 1936 Winter Olympics.

References

1913 births
1965 deaths
Polish male alpine skiers
Olympic alpine skiers of Poland
Alpine skiers at the 1936 Winter Olympics
Sportspeople from Zakopane
20th-century Polish people